Theodore Dietrich Garbade (September 12, 1873 – January 26, 1961) was a merchant and banker, he was President of the Union of Manufacturers of Cigars of Cuba.

As a young man he moved from the German Village of Cigarmakers “Zigarrenmacherdorf “Hastedt, Bremen to Cuba where he worked as a leaf buyer for Hermann Dietrich Upmann  and his Tobacco Company. He was President of the Union of Manufacturers of Cigars of Cuba, and joined H.Upmann as an associate member and became their partner at the Bank: H. Upmann & Co. till 1917 when he moved to New York. He was Head of the Chamber of Commerce in Cuba in 1917.

Theodore Garbade played a significant role in the settlement between Cuba and the United States after, President Wilson succeeded 1913 in passing the Revenue Act, also known as the Tariff Act, or the Underwood Act. The Act established the lowest rates since the Walker Tariff of 1857. Most schedules were ad valorem basis, a percentage of the value of the item. This had a profound impact for the Cuban Tobacco Industry concerning their import to the States. As President of the Union of Manufacturers of Cigars of Cuba Garbade, aided by an appointed committee, laid this out to Cuban ´s President Mario García Menocal in January 1914, insisting upon an allowance of 50 per cent on their exports of cigars as an equivalent in Cuba’s next reciprocity treaty and urging a prompt solution of this matter so vital to the Cuban cigar industry.

A German Citizen in the United States in 1916, he was considered prisoner of war, and put under house arrest in his mansion in Mount Kisko, New York. In 1919 he moved to San Sebastián, Spain and in 1921 to Lucerne, Switzerland where he applied for a Swiss passport. Owner of plantations and other properties in Cuba, he lost a great part of his fortune by Confiscation in 1960 after the Cuban Revolution. He died only one year later. Garbade was married four times. Theodor jr, is son of his first spouse Graziella Aguirre del Monte who died in 1909. His second wife Aida Heydrich (1887 -1920), daughter of Emilio Heydrich, gave him two sons: Robert D. Garbade (Filmmaker and first cameraman of the Swiss Television) and Bernhard R. Garbade, father of swiss artist Daniel Garbade, director of “Zurich” Insurance Group, Philanthropist and sponsor of  Church Organs. Theodore Garbade is buried with his last wife Hildegard von Ohlen (1903 -1962) at the Flims Waldhaus cemetery, Switzerland.

Literature 
 Reginald Lloyd, Jose' Pla' Carceles: Twentieth Century Impressions of Cuba, Editor: Lloyd's Greater Britain publishing Company, Limited, 1913
 The Cuba Review and Bulletin, Editor:Munson Steamship Line, 1913
 United States Tobacco Journal, vol. 83, BMT Publications, 1915
 Thomas Skinner: The London Banks and Kindred Companies and Firms, Editor: T. Skinner & Company, 1916
 Martin Torodash: Woodrow Wilson and the Tarriff (sic) Question: The Importance of the Underwood Act in His Reform Program.Editor: New York University, Graduate School of Arts and Science, 1966
  Alfredo Gómez Llorens: Instituciones y ciclo económico de la República de Cuba. Palibrio, 2014
 Noel Maurer: The Empire Trap: The Rise and Fall of U.S. Intervention to Protect American, Editor: Princeton University Press, 2013,

References 

1873 births
1961 deaths
Cuban bankers
Cigar makers
Cuban businesspeople
Emigrants from Germany to Spanish Cuba